Provincial Road 246 (PR 246) is a provincial road in the Canadian province of Manitoba. It runs from PR 200 near Ste. Agathe to PTH 75 at St. Jean Baptiste.

Both PR 246 and PR 200 are often referred to as St. Mary's Road, as the two roads mostly follow the old St. Mary's Road that once connected Winnipeg and Emerson on the east side of the Red River.  Today, most of PR 246 is gravel road; only a short section near St. Jean Baptiste is paved.  The southern terminus of PR 246 at St. Jean Baptiste has been cut off from the rest of the road since the bridge over the Red River was closed in 2015 and later demolished.

A  section between PR 205 and Provincial Trunk Highway (PTH) 23 is due to be upgraded and paved by the Manitoba government to serve as a detour for when PTH 75, a major transportation route that runs along the west side of the river, is closed at Morris due to flooding.

References

External links 
Manitoba Official Map

246